D50 state road, located mainly in Lika region of Croatia connecting cities and towns of Otočac, Gospić, Perušić and Gračac, to the state road network of Croatia, and most notably to  A1 motorway at a number of interchanges - Otočac and Sveti Rok interchanges (directly) and Gospić and Gornja Ploča interchanges (via D534 and D522 state roads respectively). The route comprises a significant number of urban intersections, in segment of the road running through Gospić.

The D50 state road runs parallel to a section of the A1 motorway between Žuta Lokva and Sveti Rok interchanges, thus serving as an alternate or backup route for the motorway.

The road, as well as all other state roads in Croatia, is managed and maintained by Hrvatske ceste, a state-owned company.

Traffic volume 

Traffic is regularly counted and reported by Hrvatske ceste, operator of the road.  Substantial variations between annual (AADT) and summer (ASDT) traffic volumes at some counting sites are attributed to the fact that the road connects to D23 and D27 which in turn provide connections to the Adriatic coast resorts and other major highways.

Road junctions and populated areas

Sources

D050
D050
D050